The 2020 Oklahoma Republican presidential primary took place on March 3, 2020, as one of fourteen contests scheduled for Super Tuesday in the Republican Party presidential primaries for the 2020 presidential election. 

Incumbent United States President Donald Trump was challenged by five candidates: businessman and perennial candidate Rocky De La Fuente of California, entrepreneur and investor Bob Ely of Massachusetts, entrepreneur and attorney Matthew Matern of Louisiana, transhumanist activist Zoltan Istvan of California, and former congressman Joe Walsh of Illinois. Oklahoma was the only contested Super Tuesday state where former governor Bill Weld of Massachusetts was not on the ballot. Walsh withdrew from the race prior to the primary.

Results
Trump won the state in a landslide victory against his five opponents.

Results by county

See also
 2020 Oklahoma Democratic presidential primary

References

Oklahoma Republican
Republican primary
Oklahoma Republican primaries